Watercolor painting is a painting method in which the paints are made of pigments suspended in a water-based solution.

Watercolor, Watercolors, Watercolour, or Watercolours may also refer to:

 Color of water, an intrinsic property of the covalently-bonded chemical substance
 Water Colors (album), the first album by Japanese songwriter Ayako Ikeda
 Water Colours, the debut studio album by the American electronica band, Swimming With Dolphins
 WaterColor, Florida, an unincorporated master-planned community located in Seagrove Beach
 Watercolors (Pat Metheny album), 1977
 Watercolors (Ducktails album), 2019
 Watercolors (film), a 2008 film by American director David Oliveras
 Watercolors (Sirius XM), a Sirius XM Radio music channel that specializes in playing smooth jazz
 Watercolour, a 2008–2012 built settlement and neighbourhood in Redhill, Surrey
 "Watercolour" (song), the first single from the third album Immersion by Australian drum and bass band Pendulum
 "Watercolors", a song by Janis Ian from her 1975 album Between the Lines
 The Watercolor, a 2009 Turkish animated film